The 1988 Japanese Formula 3000 Championship was contested over 8 rounds. 18 different teams, 24 different drivers, 5 different chassis and 3 different engines competed.

Calendar

Final point standings

Driver

For every race points were awarded: 9 points to the winner, 6 for runner-up, 4 for third place, 3 for fourth place, 2 for fifth place and 1 for sixth place. No additional points were awarded. The best 6 results count.

Complete Overview

R=retired NS=did not start NQ=did not qualify

Formula 3000
Super Formula